There have been three baronetcies created for persons with the surname Hare, one in the Baronetage of England and two in the Baronetage of the United Kingdom. One creation is extant as of 2007.

The Hare Baronetcy, of Stow Bardolph in the County of Norfolk, was created in the Baronetage of England on 23 July 1641 for Ralph Hare, Member of Parliament for Norfolk and King's Lynn. He was the great-grandson of Sir Nicholas Hare, Speaker of the House of Commons from 1539 to 1540, who purchased the Stow Bardolph estate in 1553. The second Baronet also represented Norfolk in the House of Commons. The title became extinct on the death of the fifth Baronet in 1764.

The Hare Baronetcy, of Stow Hall in the County of Norfolk, was created in the Baronetage of the United Kingdom on 14 December 1818 for Thomas Hare. He was the grandson of Thomas Leigh (a member of the same family as the Barons Leigh), husband of Mary, second daughter of the second Baronet of the 1641 creation and sister and co-heiress of the fifth Baronet of the 1641 creation. Born Thomas Leigh, he assumed by Act of Parliament the surname of Hare in lieu of his patronymic in 1791. The third Baronet was High Sheriff of Norfolk in 1906.

The Hare Baronetcy, of Stow Hall in the County of Norfolk, was created in the Baronetage of the United Kingdom on 21 December 1905 for Thomas Leigh Hare, who represented Norfolk South-West in the House of Commons between 1892 and 1906. The title became extinct on his death in 1941.

Hare baronets, of Stow Bardolph (1641)
Sir Ralph Hare, 1st Baronet (1623–1672) 
Sir Thomas Hare, 2nd Baronet (–1693) 
Sir Ralph Hare, 3rd Baronet (c. 1681–1732) 
Sir Thomas Hare, 4th Baronet (1690–1760) 
Sir George Hare, 5th Baronet (c. 1701–1764)

Hare baronets, of Stow Hall (1818)

Sir Thomas Hare, 1st Baronet (died 1834) 
Sir Thomas Hare, 2nd Baronet (1807–1880) 
Sir George Ralph Leigh Hare, 3rd Baronet (1866–1933) 
Sir Ralph Leigh Hare, 4th Baronet (1903–1976) 
Sir Thomas Hare, 5th Baronet (1930–1993) 
Sir Philip Leigh Hare, 6th Baronet (1922–2000) 
Sir Nicholas Patrick Hare, 7th Baronet (born 1955)

The heir apparent to the baronetcy is Thomas Edward Hare (born 1986), eldest son of the 7th Baronet.

Hare baronets, of Stow Hall (1905)
Sir Thomas Leigh Hare, 1st Baronet (1859–1941)

References
Kidd, Charles, Williamson, David (editors). Debrett's Peerage and Baronetage (1990 edition). New York: St Martin's Press, 1990.

Baronetcies in the Baronetage of the United Kingdom
Extinct baronetcies in the Baronetage of England
Extinct baronetcies in the Baronetage of the United Kingdom